Niakaté is a French surname that may refer to
Kalidiatou Niakaté (born 1995), French handball player 
Modibo Niakaté (born 1981), French basketball player
Youssouf Niakaté (born 1992), French association football player
Sikou Niakaté (born 1999), French association football player
Yakaré Niakaté (born 1997), French association football player

French-language surnames